The British Rail Class 322 were electric multiple unit passenger trains which were built by British Rail Engineering Limited in 1990 for the Stansted Express service from London Liverpool Street to Stansted Airport. After becoming surplus to requirements on this route, the fleet saw further use with a number of other operators.

Description

In 1987 British Rail (BR) was extending electrification north from London Liverpool Street towards Cambridge. Included in this plan was the construction of new branch line, diverging from the main line at Stansted Mountfitchet, to serve the newly built Stansted Airport station, which opened in 1991. BR decided to build a dedicated fleet of units to work a new service, the Stansted Express.

The Class 322 units were built to the same basic design as the Class 321 units, which were still under construction for services on the Great Eastern Main Line and West Coast Main Line, but with a larger First Class area in the DTCO resulting in a different window arrangement. Although the Stansted route fell under the jurisdiction of Network SouthEast (NSE), the units were delivered into service in a special white livery with a broad green band, instead of the more usual NSE blue/red/white livery.

Five 4-car units were built, numbered 322481–322485. Each unit consisted of two outer driving trailers, an intermediate trailer, and an intermediate motor coach,  arranged and numbered as follows:

Originally the units had a lower density 2+2 seating arrangement in Standard Class appropriate to their use on airport traffic, but during their C6X refurbishment between 2005 and 2007 the units were converted to standard-class only and fitted with high-density 3+2 seating. The DTC and DTS vehicles were redesignated DTS(A) and DTS(B) respectively at this time. Following transfer from First ScotRail to Northern Rail in 2011, the first-class seating was refitted to the DTS(A) vehicles; but it was removed again in 2015 and replaced with a universally-accessible toilet. At this point the DTS(A) and DTS(B) vehicles were respectively redesignated DTSL and DTS.

Operations

Network SouthEast

On introduction in 1990 the Class 322s were painted in a joint livery for Network SouthEast (NSE) and British Airports Authority consisting of a light grey and white body with green waist band lettered "Stansted Express" on one side and "Network SouthEast" on the other. Until opening of the Stansted Airport spur the units worked peak-hour services between Cambridge and Liverpool Street, but also found use on special trains wandering as far afield and York and Colchester.

West Anglia Great Northern
In the lead up to the privatisation of British Rail, in 1994 all were sold to Eversholt Rail Group. All passed with the franchise to West Anglia Great Northern in January 1997. Having been replaced by Class 317s on Stansted services, they were used indiscriminately as part of the general fleet and would operate on other WAGN services including on the East Coast Main Line from London King's Cross to Peterborough.

Sub-leasing from WAGN
In 1998 two Class 322 units were sub-leased to North Western Trains to operate a service between Euston and Manchester Airport but the service was discontinued after a year and the units were returned to WAGN. From 1998 units were also occasionally sub-let to Silverlink and used on services between Euston and Birmingham and to Anglia Railways to cover for late delivery of units for London Liverpool Street to Norwich services.

ScotRail
In December 2001, all were transferred to fellow National Express franchise ScotRail to replace the slam-door Class 305s on the North Berwick Line. To facilitate their movement to Glasgow Shields Road TMD, they also operated limited services to Glasgow Central via the Carstairs line.

One
On the instructions of the Strategic Rail Authority, all returned to WAGN in March 2004 in preparation for the takeover of the franchise by One.  Under One, the Class 322s were using in a common pool with the Class 321s.

First ScotRail

Having been deemed surplus by One, in July 2005 all returned to Scotland to operate with First ScotRail on the North Berwick Line, while also being used on peak services to Glasgow and Carstairs. To provide cover while its Class 321s were overhauled, 322484 was hired to Northern Rail to operate Doncaster to Leeds services. In 2006/07, all were refurbished by Hunslet-Barclay, Kilmarnock with capacity increased from 252 to 293.

Northern
Having been superseded by Class 380s, all were transferred to Northern Rail in July and August 2011. Based at Neville Hill TMD, they operated services from Leeds to Doncaster, Bradford Forster Square, Skipton and Ilkley. Having passed with the franchise to Arriva Rail North and Northern Trains, all were replaced by Class 331s with the last withdrawn in May 2020.

Greater Anglia
In July 2020 all were leased to Greater Anglia to operate services out of London Liverpool Street on the Great Eastern Main Line. They were leased to allow Class 360s to move to East Midlands Railway.

Greater Anglia withdrew the fleet from service in August 2022, and by the end of September all five units had been scrapped.

Fleet details

Named units
Some units were named.
322481: North Berwick Flyer 1850-2000
322485: North Berwick Flyer 1850-2000

References

External links

322
322
Train-related introductions in 1990
25 kV AC multiple units